Jamie McGowan may refer to:

 Jamie McGowan (footballer, born 1970), English footballer
 Jamie McGowan (footballer, born 1997), Scottish footballer

See also
 James McGowan (disambiguation)